Events in the year 2017 in Egypt.

Incumbents
President: Abdel Fattah el-Sisi
Prime Minister: Sherif Ismail

Events
9 April – The Palm Sunday church bombings, twin suicide bombings that took place at St. George’s Church in Tanta, and Saint Mark's Coptic Orthodox Cathedral in Alexandria, killed at least 45 people and injured more than 100. 
26 May – Egyptian military launch airstrikes against Libyan targets due to terrorist attack which killed 26 Coptic Christians.
11 August – Alexandria train collision.

Sport
1-9 July –  the 2017 FIBA Under-19 Basketball World Cup was held in Cairo 
18-25 August – the 2017 FIVB Volleyball Men's U23 World Championship, volleyball event hosted by Egypt

Deaths

12 January – Karima Mokhtar, actress (b. 1934).

15 June – Ibrahim Abouleish, pharmacologist (b.1937)

See also
List of Egyptian films of 2017

References

 
2010s in Egypt
Years of the 21st century in Egypt
Egypt
Egypt
Egypt